The Panthers F.C. is an Equatoguinean football club based in the city of Malabo. The club was founded in 1997. Their home ground is the Nuevo Estadio de Malabo which holds a capacity of 15,250, their ground was built in 2007 primarily to host the 2012 Africa Cup of Nations. Their former chairman was current Akonangui FC president Ruslán Obiang Nsue (son of Teodoro Obiang). They currently play in the Liga Nacional de Fútbol.

Notable players

Achievements
Equatoguinean Cup: 2
2012, 2013

External links
The Panthers at ZeroZero.pt

Football clubs in Equatorial Guinea
Sport in Malabo
1997 establishments in Equatorial Guinea